Andrea Bruna Barrientos Sahonero (born 30 March 1989) is a Bolivian businesswoman, politician, and singer-songwriter serving as senator for Cochabamba since 2020. A member of Civic Community, she served as the leader of the alliance's caucus in the Senate from 2020 to 2021.

Early life and career 
Andrea Barrientos was born on 30 March 1989 in Cochabamba. Barrientos was educated at the Federico Froebel German School, where from a young age, she participated in volunteer and leadership activities aimed at environmental conservation. In high school, she assisted in various urban forestry projects, planting and maintaining trees in the streets and squares of Cochabamba. At the same time, Barrientos worked part-time with Terapéutica Puntiti, an organization dedicated to assisting children with learning disabilities. Barrientos attended the Bolivian Catholic University, where she graduated with degrees in Philosophy and Letters. As a university student, she involved herself in numerous United Nations programs, representing Bolivia at events in Mexico and Switzerland. In 2014, she joined the Cochabamba branch of Global Shapers Community, an international youth organization dedicated to developing projects surrounding political activism, education, environmentalism, and technology.

At the age of 15, she started the band Inédito. Upon entering university, Barrientos became a singer for the rock band Espiral, with which she has participated in multiple festivals and tours. During this time, she wrote songs for both herself and other popular Bolivian singers and bands. However, she eventually put an end to that life path to pursue an entrepreneurial career. She is the co-founder and chief innovation officer of the company Andes Business Solutions.

Chamber of Senators

Elections 

Barrientos entered the political sphere in late 2016 and early 2017 when she joined the D-19 youth platform, which stood in opposition to the Plurinational Constitutional Court's decision to allow President Evo Morales to run for a fourth term. Through a family friend, she began participating in political meetings, where she met César Virguetti, who invited her to join the national directorate of Civic Community (CC). In the 2019 general elections, CC presented Barrientos as its candidate for first senator for Cochabamba. Though the results of that election were annulled, she was once again presented in 2020, where she was elected as the only opposition senator in the department.

Tenure 
At a plenary session of elected legislators of CC held in La Paz on 28 October 2020, Barrientos was elected as the leader of the alliance's caucus in the Chamber of Senators. Politically, she has aligned herself at the left-wing of the coalition, making statements in support of women's and LGBT rights as well as the unrestricted legalization of abortion. She has also called for substantial educational, health, judicial, and tax reform. To combat the illicit drug trade, Barrientos proposed the legalization of medical marijuana, though she affirmed that any further steps would necessitate "a great national debate".

Unlike other opposition leaders, Barrientos was not entirely opposed to cooperating with the ruling Movement for Socialism (MAS-IPSP), stating: "we want to break that idea that the opposition opposes everything for the sake of it... and that involves a constant dialogue with the MAS". In one statement at a Senate session, Barrientos stated that she "has more in common" with the MAS than with the right-wing Creemos. Those assertions garnered criticism from opposition politicians, including from within her own bloc, and led CC to publicly clarify that they were made in a "personal capacity". As a result, on 10 September 2021, she stepped down as CC's Senate leader in order to avoid potential divisions within the opposition.

During a debate in the Senate on 29 July 2021, La Paz Senator Hilarion Padilla stated that "I don't have to argue with [Barrientos], because in the end she is a woman", a statement Barrientos repudiated as "explicit machismo". The following day, Barrientos filed a complaint against Padilla with the Ethics Commission, saying that it was "extremely important that a precedent be established within the institution so that this doesn't repeat". She went on to consider that it was "unacceptable that we have sexist representatives" in government. Padilla later apologized and confirmed that he would appear before the Ethics Commission if summoned.

Commission assignments 
 Plural Justice, Public Ministry, and Legal Defense of the State Commission
 Public Ministry and Legal Defense of the State Committee (Secretary; 10 November 2021–present)
 Rural Indigenous Nations and Peoples, Cultures, and Interculturality Commission
 Culture, Interculturality, and Cultural Heritage Committee (Secretary; 10 November 2020–10 November 2021)

Electoral history

References

Notes

Footnotes

External links 
 Senate profile Chamber of Senators .
 Cochabamba Hub at Global Shapers Community.

1989 births
Living people
21st-century Bolivian businesspeople
21st-century Bolivian politicians
21st-century Bolivian women politicians
21st-century Bolivian women singers
Bolivian abortion-rights activists
Bolivian environmentalists
Bolivian feminists
Bolivian senators from Cochabamba
Bolivian singer-songwriters
Bolivian women's rights activists
Civic Community politicians
Members of the Senate of Bolivia
People from Cochabamba
Women members of the Senate of Bolivia